Saskia Feige (born 13 August 1997) is a German racewalker. She competed in the women's 20 kilometres walk event at the 2019 World Athletics Championships held in Doha, Qatar. She finished in 11th place. She also competed in the women's 20 kilometres walk at the 2020 Summer Olympics held in Tokyo, Japan.

Career 

In 2017, she competed in the women's 20 kilometres walk at the European Athletics U23 Championships held in Bydgoszcz, Poland.

The following year, she competed in the women's 20 kilometres walk at the 2018 European Athletics Championships held in Berlin, Germany. She finished in 16th place.

She competed in the women's 20 kilometres walk at the 2022 World Athletics Championships held in Eugene, Oregon, United States.

International competitions

References

External links 
 

Living people
1997 births
Place of birth missing (living people)
German female racewalkers
World Athletics Championships athletes for Germany
German national athletics champions
Athletes (track and field) at the 2020 Summer Olympics
Olympic female racewalkers
Olympic athletes of Germany
European Athletics Championships medalists
20th-century German women
21st-century German women